Andreas Athanasakopoulos (born 27 November 2001) is a Greek professional footballer who plays as an attacking midfielder for Super League 2 club Panathinaikos B.

Career

Panathinaikos
Athanasakopoulos plays mainly as a midfielder.

Career statistics

References

External links

2001 births
Living people
Greek footballers
Greece youth international footballers
Panathinaikos F.C. players
Super League Greece players
Super League Greece 2 players
Association football midfielders
Footballers from Patras
Thyella Patras F.C. players
Panathinaikos F.C. B players